Odontella cornifer is a species of springtail in the family Odontellidae.

References

Collembola
Articles created by Qbugbot
Animals described in 1934